Don't let Devon go to waste is an recycling and waste-awareness campaign, based in the county of Devon.  The campaign was created in 2002.

In order to encourage the public to Reduce, Reuse, Recycle and Compost across the county, Don't let Devon go to waste is jointly funded by all eleven local authorities, which form the Devon Authorities Recycling Partnership.

Campaign Success 
Numerous adverts have been produced for the campaign. In 2008, 'A Fistful of Rubbish', which was aired across the county's cinemas and local television stations, won the international Chip Shop  Award; it was also used by Cumbria County Council in 2009. The advert was directed by Peter Richardson of 'The Comic Strip Presents' fame on behalf of the Exeter-based advertising agency, RH Advertising and follows a spaghetti western storyline with a recycling standoff ending with two men stripping naked and pushing their clothes into the recycling bank. As they strip off an old lady passing by on her bicycle steers into a ditch. The strapline is "Recycling. Give it all you've got."

Various celebrities, including Phillipa Forrester,  Rik Mayall and the late Keith Floyd, have publicly supported the campaign, with both Mayall and Floyd appearing in television adverts. Most recent was the involvement of Location, Location, Location presenter Kirstie Allsopp, who became the face of the composting campaign in 2009.

Love Food, Hate Waste 

From 2008, Don't let Devon go to waste has been supporting the national Love Food Hate Waste campaign, which was launched by the Waste & Resources Action Programme, in order to tackle the £11 Billion worth of food thrown away in Britain each year.

See also 
Food waste in the United Kingdom

References

External links 
  recycledevon.org
 Don't let Devon go to waste at YouTube
  lovefoodhatewaste.com
  stairway-to-devon.co.uk (2009-04-07). * [http://www.exeterchamber.co.uk/Exeter-Food-Festival.html Exeter Festival celebrates record attendance Exeter:exeterchamber.co.uk. Retrieved 2010-08-06.

Organisations based in Devon
Recycling in the United Kingdom
Waste in the United Kingdom
Articles containing video clips
2002 establishments in England
Organizations established in 2002